Jane Anderson (born  1954 in California) is an American actress, playwright, screenwriter and director. She wrote and directed the feature film The Prize Winner of Defiance, Ohio (2005), and wrote the Nicolas Cage film It Could Happen to You (1994). She won an Emmy Award for writing the screenplay for the miniseries Olive Kitteridge (2014).

Career 
Jane Anderson got her start as an actress, before getting her first writing job as a writer and consultant on the sitcom The Facts of Life (on which she had also appeared). She followed this up by creating the short-lived sitcom Raising Miranda, which was cancelled in its first season. She then had several other TV series gigs, and wrote her first play, The Baby Dance (1989).

Her first film experience was writing the 1993 HBO film The Positively True Adventures of the Alleged Texas Cheerleader-Murdering Mom, starring Holly Hunter; the film was critically acclaimed, and TV critics Matt Zoller Seitz and Alan Sepinwall in their 2016 book TV (The Book) named it the 2nd greatest American TV movie of all time, behind Steven Spielberg's Duel. She later wrote and directed several other critically acclaimed television movies, including The Baby Dance (1998), based on her play and starring Stockard Channing and Laura Dern; When Billie Beat Bobby (2001) starring Holly Hunter and Ron Silver; and Normal (2003), based on her play Looking for Normal and starring Jessica Lange and Tom Wilkinson. She also wrote the segment "1961" of the 2000 HBO film If These Walls Could Talk 2, which won Vanessa Redgrave an Emmy Award for her portrayal of an elderly lesbian prevented from hospital visitation with her dying long-time companion.

She became a writer for the AMC television drama Mad Men for the show's second season in 2008. She was nominated for a Writers Guild of America Award for Best Dramatic Series for her work on the second season.

In 2015, Anderson wrote the documentary Packed in a Trunk: The Lost Art of Edith Lake Wilkinson about her great aunt, Edith Lake Wilkinson, a lesbian and painter who was institutionalized in the 1920s and spent the rest of her life in an asylum for the mentally ill. Anderson cites Wilkinson as an inspiration for own drawing.

In 2017, Anderson wrote the Glenn Close-starring The Wife.

Filmography

As writer / director

As producer

As actress

Other work

Plays 
 The Baby Dance (1989)
 Looking for Normal (2001)
 The Quality of Life (2007)
 The Escort: An Explicit Play for Discriminating People (2011)
 The Baby Dance: Mixed (2018; revised version of The Baby Dance)

Awards and nominations 
 Emmy Award for writing The Positively True Adventures of the Alleged Texas Cheerleader-Murdering Mom (1993)
 Emmy Award nominations for writing and directing The Baby Dance (1998)
 Emmy Award nomination for writing Normal (2003)
 Emmy Award nomination for writing If These Walls Could Talk 2 (2000) (For episode "1961")
 Women in Film Lucy Award (2000) in recognition of excellence and innovation in a writing a creative work (If These Walls Could Talk 2) that has enhanced the perception of women through the medium of television
 Directors Guild of America Award nomination for directing Normal (2003)
 Writers Guild of America Award for Best Dramatic Series for her work on the second season of Mad Men (2008)
 Los Angeles Drama Critics Circle Award (2008) for Outstanding World Premiere Play for writing The Quality of Life
 Two Ovation Awards (2008) for writing The Quality of Life
 Writers Guild of America Award for Best Long Form Adapted Series for writing Olive Kitteridge (2015)
 Emmy Award for writing Olive Kitteridge (2015)

See also 
 List of female film and television directors
 List of lesbian filmmakers
 List of LGBT-related films directed by women

References

External links 
 
 
 Profile at Curve

1950s births
Living people
20th-century American dramatists and playwrights
20th-century American women writers
American film directors
American television actresses
American television directors
American television producers
American television writers
American lesbian writers
American LGBT dramatists and playwrights
American LGBT screenwriters
American women dramatists and playwrights
American women film directors
American women screenwriters
American lesbian artists
LGBT film directors
Lesbian dramatists and playwrights
Lesbian screenwriters
American women television directors
American women television producers
American women television writers
Actresses from New Jersey
Artists from New Jersey
Screenwriters from California
Screenwriters from New Jersey
Primetime Emmy Award winners
Writers Guild of America Award winners
20th-century American screenwriters
21st-century American screenwriters
21st-century American women writers